The KROQ Top 106.7 Countdowns is an end-of-year countdown that lists the top "106.7" songs on the Los Angeles station KROQ as voted by listeners. The countdown started in 1980, and ran every year until 2009. Since 2009, the list has been compiled by fans from playlist data.

In the late 1970s and early 1980s, KROQ's proximity to Hollywood and the Los Angeles music scene gave it a unique place in the development of the punk and alternative rock genres. In its heyday, KROQ was considered the most powerful radio station in the world. It was the top-rated station in the Los Angeles metropolitan area, and its "ROQ of the 80s" format was copied nationwide. Its renegade roots, and willingness to experiment, came along at the same time as the birth of punk and new wave. The choices made by the station and its staff had a worldwide impact. This is reflected in the annual list of most popular songs.

The end of year countdown was the first among the station's "lists". Among others released are the "List Of 106.7 Biggest KROQ Bands" and "Flashback 500" or "Firecracker 500" (presenting the 500 most popular songs). In April 2020, the station released a COVID Quarantine edition of the "Top 106.7 Songs of All Time", with Everlong by the Foo Fighters topping the list.

Countdowns by year

Lack of female artist representation

Over the years, bands like the Go-Gos and the Bangles made the list, but didn't make the top spot. Missing Persons, fronted by Dale Bozzio, topped the chart in 1981, the chart's second year. However, since its inception, the number of female artists has decreased over the years, with Sinéad O'Connor being the only woman, or female act, to top the countdown. This is the same phenomena seen on the Billboard's Alternative Songs chart that went seventeen years without a woman topping the chart from 1996 to 2013.

Over the years, KROQ's Weenie Roast has also faced allegations that it does not pay enough attention to gender equity.

See also
 Triple J Hottest 100
 Women in rock

Notes

References

External links
 
 
 
 

Record charts
Top